Warren Bishop (born 17 March 1983 in Johannesburg, Gauteng) is a former South African football player.

References

1983 births
South African soccer players
Living people
Association football defenders
Soccer players from Johannesburg
White South African people
AmaZulu F.C. players
University of Pretoria F.C. players
Santos F.C. (South Africa) players
Mpumalanga Black Aces F.C. players